Björn Olof Skoog (born 6 September 1962) is a Swedish diplomat who has served as the European Union Ambassador to the UN since 2019.

Career
From March 2015 until 2019, Skoog served as Permanent Representative of Sweden to the United Nations and as the President of the United Nations Security Council for the month of January 2017 and July 2018.

Skoog served as the Swedish Ambassador to Colombia, Venezuela, Ecuador and Panama and the EU Ambassador to Indonesia, Brunei, and ASEAN.

Other activities
 International Peace Institute (IPI), Member of the International Advisory Council

Personal life
Skoog's wife Johanna Brismar is currently the Ambassador of Sweden to Brazil. They have three children.

References

External links 

C-SPAN Appearances

1962 births
Living people
Ambassadors of Sweden to Colombia
Ambassadors of Sweden to Ecuador
Ambassadors of the European Union to Indonesia
Ambassadors of the European Union to Brunei
Permanent Representatives of Sweden to the United Nations
Ambassadors of Sweden to Venezuela
21st-century Swedish people